The 2014 Basildon District Council election took place on 22 May 2014 to elect members of Basildon District Council in England. This was on the same day as other local elections and elections to the European Parliament. This election was to elect one third of the council, plus one additional seat which was vacant. These seats were last up for election in 2010.

Results

The turnout was 32.8%, and there were 160 ballots rejected. All comparisons in vote share are to the corresponding 2010 election.

Council Composition

Prior to election, the composition of the council was:

After election, the composition of the council was:

UK - UKIP
IND - Independent
L - Liberal Democrats

Ward Results

Billericay East

Billericay West

Burstead

Crouch

Fryerns

Laindon Park

Langdon Hills

Lee Chapel North

The second vacancy was caused by the resignation of an Independent councillor who had been elected in 2012 as a Labour candidate. Malsbury will fill this seat, and will thus be up for re-election in May 2016. Ferguson will fill the seat that was ordinarily due for election in 2014, and will face re-election in 2018.

Nethermayne

Pitsea North West

Pitsea South East

Wickford Castledon

Wickford North

Wickford Park

Changes since May 2014
In December 2014, Kerry Smith, the then leader of the UKIP group and newly selected parliamentary candidate for South Basildon and East Thurrock resigned from the party after the release of a tape recording of a private phone call in which he made offensive remarks about fellow UKIP members. Imelda Clancy also left the party later that month, and the two sit as "Independence Group" members on the council, reducing UKIP's strength to ten seats, though they remain the second-largest party ahead of Labour on nine seats.

A third independent councilor (originally elected as Labour) joined the Independence Group in January 2015.

References

2014 English local elections
2014
2010s in Essex